The National Assembly of Panama, formerly the Legislative Assembly of Panama (Asamblea Legislativa de Panamá),  is the legislative branch of the government of the Republic of Panama.

It is a unicameral legislature, currently made up of 71 members, who serve five-year terms.  Legislators from outlying rural districts are chosen by a first past the post method, while districts located in more populous towns and cities elect multiple legislators by means of a proportion-based formula.  Panama's legislative elections are held simultaneous with its presidential and local elections.

Panama also returns a delegation of 20 deputies to the supranational Central American Parliament.

Latest election

See also
 List of political parties in Panama
 List of presidents of the National Assembly of Panama
 Politics of Panama

External links

References 

 

Panama
Politics of Panama
Government of Panama
Panama
1906 establishments in Panama
Organizations based in Panama City
Organizations established in 1906